Tashi Bhalla (born 30 June 1984) is an Indian cricketer. He made his first-class debut for Sikkim in the 2018–19 Ranji Trophy on 7 January 2019. He made his Twenty20 debut for Sikkim in the 2018–19 Syed Mushtaq Ali Trophy on 21 February 2019. He made his List A debut on 1 October 2019, for Sikkim in the 2019–20 Vijay Hazare Trophy.

References

External links
 

1984 births
Living people
Indian cricketers
Sikkim cricketers
Place of birth missing (living people)